Patcharin Sooksai (born November 29, 1981) is a retired professional footballer from Thailand.

References

External links

1981 births
Living people
Patcharin Sooksai
Patcharin Sooksai
Association football midfielders
Patcharin Sooksai
Patcharin Sooksai
Patcharin Sooksai
Patcharin Sooksai
Patcharin Sooksai
Patcharin Sooksai
Patcharin Sooksai